The Lincoln AP was a U.S., single engine, high wing, general purpose (AP stood for All-Purpose) civil cabin aircraft first flown in 1930. Only four were built.

Design and development

The Lincoln AP, first flown in 1930, was a high wing, single-engine cabin monoplane with seats for three. The purchaser could chose between two five cylinder Kinner radial engines of different powers but the two models were otherwise similar. It was of mixed construction but entirely fabric covered. The fuselage, tail and wing, apart from its twin spruce spars, had welded Cr/Mo steel tube structures.

The wing was rectangular in plan out to angled, rounded tips, though centrally there was a gentle reduction in chord to improve the pilot's upward field of view. Parallel chord ailerons filled about half the trailing edge.  The wings were braced to the fuselage with a parallel pair of struts between spars and lower longerons on each side. At the rear both fin and tailplane had blunted triangular profile and plans. The fin carried a near semi-circular unbalanced rudder which reached down to the keel and the tailplane, mounted on top of the fuselage and inflight adjustable for trim, carried parallel chord elevators separated by cut-outs for rudder movement.

Behind the engine, mounted with cylinders exposed for cooling, the fuselage was rectangular in cross-section. The AP's cabin was largely under the wing but placed the pilot at the leading edge ahead of the two passengers sitting side-by-side; each of the three bucket seats contained a parachute space. Access was via a side door.

The AP had fixed, tailskid landing gear with the main wheels on split axles, each mounted together with a rear drag strut on the lower fuselage longerons. Vertical shock absorbing oleo struts were mounted on the forward wing struts at points strengthened with struts to both to the upper and lower longerons.

Only four APs were built, including the prototype. One was powered by a  Kinner K-5 and the other three by  Kinner B-5s.

Variants

AP-B5  Kinner B-5
AP-K5  Kinner K-5

Specifications (Kinner B-5 engine)

References

Single-engined tractor  aircraft
High-wing aircraft
1930s United States civil utility aircraft